The Thailand fifty-satang coin is currency unit equivalent to one-half of a Thai baht. It is also called สองสลึง (song salueng - "two salueng" while สลึง salueng is used to describe the 25-satang coin).

In 2008, fifty satang coin was minted both old aluminium series bronze and new copper series.

Mintages 
 1987 ~ 1,000
 1988 ~ 23,775,000
 1989 ~ 57,969,000
 1990 ~ 92,960,000
 1991 ~ 4,660,380
 1992 ~ 105,451,000
 1993 ~ 36,296,000
 1994 ~ 161,172,000
 1995 ~ 147,670,000
 1996 ~ 30,840,000
 1997 ~ 58,336,000
 1998 ~ 23,834,000
 1999 ~ 73,379,700
 2000 ~ 115,332,000
 2001 ~ 52,738,000
 2002 ~ 102,804,000
 2003 ~ 101,200,000
 2004 ~ 79,596,000
 2005 ~ 99,920,000
 2006 ~ 130,803,000
 2007 ~ 24,905,000
 2008 (old series) ~ 27,163,509
 2008 (new series) ~ 225,000,000
 2009 ~ 118,536,000

References 

Coins of Thailand
Fifty-cent coins